Flou is an alternative rock/nu metal band from Asunción, Paraguay, created in 1997. They are one of the most popular and successful rock bands from Paraguay.

History
The band was formed in 1997 by a group of friends; throughout the years the band went through several changes in line-up and music style that culminated in the year 2000 with the shaping and establishment of the original band. In 2001 the band released its first demo titled "Despetar" (Awakening) with five songs. The public's response was immediate, as the demo sold out immediately. This success led the band to sign with one of the biggest Paraguayan record labels, Kamikaze Records.

In 2003 the band recorded and released its first album, Ataraxia. This album was a success and by the end of the year Flou was chosen as the "Best Paraguayan band of the year" by the Rock & Pop FM radio station. Their second single, Delirio reached the top of the charts alongside their third single Ansias.

In 2004 the band won the "Luis Alberto del Paraná" award as the best rock band in Paraguay. The success for the band continued in 2005 and 2006 where they participated in the popular Pilsen Rock festival in Asunción where they played in front of a crowd of 85,000 people.

Their long-awaited second album was released at the end of 2006.

On April 22, 2010 they released their third album called Tanto y Nada.

Discography

Despertar 
(2001, Demo, Independent)
El Recuerdo Aquel
Lado Oscuro
Despertar
Confusión
Demente

Ataraxia 
(2003, LP, Kamikaze Records)
Dejar Morir al Tiempo  	
Lado Oscuro
El Recuerdo Aquel
Aqui Mismo
Despertar
Delirio
Ansias
A Traves de Tus Ojos
Demente
Amarrarme a tu ser
Confusión
Sin Salida

Tacito
(2006, LP, Independent)
Desapareciendo
Dejarse Llevar
Cada Vez
A Tu Lado
Nada que Esperar
Sin Tu Voz
Libre
Polaroid
Mi Herida
Vortice
Al Amanecer
Luz

Tanto y Nada 
(2010, LP, Independent)

 Si Pudieras Esperar
 Mea Culpa 
 Tanto y Nada
 Todo Vuelve a Comenzar
 Ecos
 Mil Años Más
 Solamente Así
 Solo una vez Más
 Sin Desesperar
 Un Segundo Más
 Tan Distante
 Tu Fragilidad
 Cambiar de Piel

Members
Walter Cabrera - (vocals, guitar)
Bruno Ferreiro - (guitar)
Federico Wagener - (bass)
Guillermo Gayo - (drums)

Former members
Ariel Insfrán - (guitar 2000/2002)
Ariel Sandoval - (drums 1997/2006)

References

External links
FLOUmusic.com
Flou in MySpace 

Paraguayan musical groups